The Church San José of Gurabo (Spanish: Iglesia San José de Gurabo) is a historic Catholic parish church located in Gurabo Pueblo (downtown Gurabo) in the municipality of Gurabo, Puerto Rico. The parish church is part of the Roman Catholic Diocese of Caguas.

The current church structure dates to 1821, and it was erected 6 years after the official founding of the municipality of Gurabo. The church was added to the National Register of Historic Places on September 18, 1984.

References 

Churches on the National Register of Historic Places in Puerto Rico
Roman Catholic churches completed in 1821
19th-century Roman Catholic church buildings in the United States
Roman Catholic churches in Puerto Rico
1821 establishments in New Spain
Gurabo, Puerto Rico
1820s establishments in Puerto Rico